The National Association of Cambodian Scouts (NACS;) is the national Scouting organization in Cambodia. It was founded in September 2005 through the merger of the Scout Organization of Cambodia and the Cambodian Scouts and became a member of the World Organization of the Scout Movement (WOSM) on 1 July 2008. The coeducational association serves 5,404 members as of 2011.

History

Earlier Scouting organizations
The original Cambodian Scout Association Angkar Khemarak Kayarith (AKK) was created in 1934, under the direction of Prince Sisowath Monireth and other leaders. This first era of Cambodian Scouting spread over several provinces and numbered more than 1,000 members.

André Lefèvre, chief of the Eclaireurs de France, set up a training camp for 60 Scoutmasters from all over French Indochina. At the end of 1937, French Scouting sent Scoutmaster Raymond Schlemmer to the Cambodian, Laotian, and Vietnamese areas of Indochina to oversee the setting up of the Fédération Indochinoise des Associations du Scoutisme (FIAS, Indochinese Federation of Scouting Associations) in all three regions.

From 1939 through 1945, the political situation affected Scouting activities all across the country, as World War II engendered a movement for an independent Cambodia. The French began to lose control and were finally overthrown by Japanese intervention. This ceased the French Scouts' activity in Cambodia, as well as all Scouting activities.

In 1956, the Cambodian Scouting movement was transformed into the Scouts of the Queen. That year, there were 500 active Scouts and Guides in Phnom Penh, and some 700 Scouts in the provinces of the Kingdom of Cambodia.

In 1957, under the direction of socialist-leaning Prince Norodom Sihanouk, the Angkar Khemarak Kayarith was transformed into the Jeunesse Socialiste Royale Khmer (JSRK, the Royal Socialist Khmer Youth), with Sihanouk himself serving as president of the state ruled organization, now controlled by the Royal government. The 2,000 members and the leaders of Cambodian Scouting were permitted by the government to carry on activities. Scouts and Scout leaders attended the 8th World Scout Jamboree in 1955 in Canada and the 10th World Scout Jamboree in 1959 in the Philippines, among them Prince Norodom Yuvaneath, the son of Norodom Sihanouk.

On 1 November 1964, Prince Sisowath Essaro, then President of the Angkar Khemarak Kayarith, announced the dissolution of the Cambodian Boy Scout Association, whose members were subsequently integrated into the Jeunesse Socialiste Royale Khmer, a government-sponsored socialist youth movement.

In 1972, the Cambodian Scouts were reestablished for a short period with ten groups, confined to the capital in Phnom Penh. In 1975, the movement was banned by the Khmer Rouge communist regime.

Cambodian Scouting in exile existed at least into the early 1990s in Los Angeles, alongside fellow Vietnamese Scouting in exile and Laotian Scouting in exile groups.

Reemergence of Scouting after 1990

As the political system changed in the country, Scouting was gradually reestablished and Scout groups were organized in the refugee camps at the Thai border. After the 1993 election supported by the United Nations, Beat Gruninger, a Swiss Scout leader was commissioned by the World Scout Bureau to coordinate with Cambodian leaders for the possible rebirth of Scouting in the recovering land.

In 1994, two visits were made by the Asia-Pacific Region to assess the development of the Cambodian Scout movement. As with Afghanistan, Scouting was conducted under the auspices of a government agency, in this case the Department of Youth and Sports. Asia-Pacific Region staff met the Minister of Education, Youth and Sports and several other government officials, after which full government support was assured.

In April 1996, the first Basic Unit Leaders Training Course was held in Phnom Penh, assisted by the National Scout Organization of Thailand and the Asia-Pacific Regional office.

Subsequently, two main Scout groupings emerged in Cambodia and were registered in July 2000: the Scout Organization of Cambodia and the Cambodian Scouts. Both Scout associations were run by rival political parties. For this reason, WOSM could not admit either of them as a member. In the effort to unite these into a new single national association, the Coordinating Scout Committee of Cambodia (CSCC) was created on 21 April 2000. A working group composed of leaders from the two groups was established in May 2005 to work on a new constitution and new bylaws. In September 2005, the National Association of Cambodian Scouts was created. It sought formal government recognition to launch it as a nongovernmental organization.

The World Scout Bureau Asia Pacific Regional Office reported in their May 2006 Newsletter, that the first annual general meeting of the National Association of Cambodian Scouts was held on 27 April 2006 in Phnom Penh, at which the constitution was adopted and the first office-bearers were elected.

The World Scout Bureau received an application for membership in the World Organization of the Scout Movement from the National Association of Cambodian Scouts in 2007. Members of the World Scout Bureau and of the Asia-Pacific Regional Office assessed the organization in November 2007; they proposed its admission to WOSM. Full WOSM membership was granted on 1 July 2008.

The National Association of Cambodian Scouts is planning to organize their first National Scout Jamboree, to be held in December 2008, close to the Angkor Wat World Heritage Site.

Program
To further the development of Scouting in Cambodia the association focuses on:
 Orientation of adult leaders on Scouting at all levels
 Training of adult leaders
 Participating in various community development/service projects
 Production of a range of Scouting literature
 Establishment of partnerships with government and other external agencies
 Participation in regional and other national level Scout activities.

The National Association of Cambodian Scouts is divided in three sections according to age:
 Cub Scouts
 Scouts
 Rovers.

Scout ideals 
As with most other countries, the Scout sign and salute are made with three fingers. 

The Scout Motto is ត្រៀមខ្លួន  (meaning "to be ready").

The national heraldic badge features Angkor Wat, which is also featured on the national flag.

See also
 Scouting and Guiding in Cambodia

References

External links
 Background information on Scouting in Cambodia

World Organization of the Scout Movement member organizations
Scouting and Guiding in Cambodia
Organizations established in 2005